Less Than Evil is a 2018 South Korean television series based on the British series Luther. It stars Shin Ha-kyun, Lee Seol, Park Ho-san and Kim Gun-woo. It aired on MBC from December 3, 2018 to January 29, 2019.

Synopsis
The drama centers on the ongoing psychological battle between a brilliant psychopathic murderer and a hot headed, justice-driven Detective Chief Inspector.

Cast

Main
 Shin Ha-kyun as Woo Tae-suk
 As a tough and unscrupulous detective with the highest arrest rate, a character based on DCI John Luther. 
 Lee Seol as Eun Sun-jae/Bae yeo-wool
 A female psychopath based on antagonist Alice Morgan. 
 Park Ho-san as Jeon Choon-man
 A leading detective in the metropolitan area who is at odds with Woo Tae-suk
 Kim Gun-woo as Jang Hyung-min
 A serial killer who pretends to be a prosecutor and Woo Tae-suk's greatest enemy based on serial killer Tom Marwood.

Supporting
 Baro as Chae Dong-yoon
 A straight-as-an-arrow detective who graduated early from the police academy based on Luther's partner DS Justin Ripley. 
 Bae Da-bin as Shin Ga-young
 A prickly police officer based on DCI Erin Gray. 
 Bae Yoo-ram as Ban Ji-deuk
 An expert in IT programming who sets up her own detective agency based on DS Benny Silver. 
 Yoon Hee-seok as Jo Doo-jin
 The head of the PR department at the police station and Woo Tae-suk's best friend based on John Luther's best friend DCI Ian Reed. 
 Yang Ki-won as Lee Moon-ki
 A policeman on Woo Tae-suk's team  
 Kim Na-yoon as Team Leader Sung
 The head of forensic investigative team based on Luther's bosses DSU Rose Teller and DSU Martin Schnek. 
 Hong Eun-hee as Kim Hae-joon
 A lawyer and Woo Tae-suk's wife based on John Luther's wife Zoe Luther. 
 Cho Yi-hyun as Bae Yeo-wool
 A victim of a case that Woo Tae-suk cannot forget
 Bae Yoon-kyung as Woo Tae-hee
 Woo Tae-suk's sister
 Ryu Tae-ho  as Choi Jung-woo 
 A timid head detective who is indecisive. He works with Jeon Choon-man
 Kim Yi-kyung as Kwon Soo-ah

Special appearances 
 Ahn Nae-sang as Commissioner general.

Production
The actress Lee Seol was chosen among 300 others who auditioned for the role of Eun Sun-jae to play the female lead.

The first script reading was held in early September, 2018 with the attendance of cast and crew at the MBC in Sangam-dong.

Original soundtrack

Part 1

Part 2

Part 3

Ratings
 In this table,  represent the lowest ratings and  represent the highest ratings.
 NR denotes that the drama did not rank in the top 20 daily programs on that date.
 N/A denotes that the rating is not known.

Awards and nominations

Notes

References

External links
  

 

MBC TV television dramas
2018 South Korean television series debuts
2019 South Korean television series endings
Korean-language television shows
South Korean crime television series
South Korean thriller television series
Television series by IHQ (company)
South Korean television series based on British television series
Luther (TV series)